This is a list of recipients of United States Artists (USA) Fellowship grants. The grant is issued annually by United States Artists (USA) a non-government philanthropic organization that supports living American artists.

USA Fellows

2006

2007

2008

2009

2010

2011

2012 
Actor Tim Robbins presented the 2012 awards a celebration held at the Los Angeles Getty Center.

2013 
No fellowship grants awards were given in 2013.

2014

2015

2016

2017

2018

2019

2020

References

Fellowships